The 1947 South American Basketball Championship was the 13th edition of this regional tournament.  It was held in Rio de Janeiro, Brazil, and won by the Uruguay national basketball team.  6 teams competed.

Final rankings

Results

Each team played the other five teams once, for a total of five games played by each team and 15 overall in the preliminary round. Ties in the standings were broken by head-to-head results, as only a tie for first would have resulted in a final match.

External links

FIBA.com archive for SAC1947

1947
S
B
1947 in Brazilian sport
1947
Champ
20th century in Rio de Janeiro
May 1947 sports events in South America
June 1947 sports events in South America